Elisabeth Chevanne Brunel (born 2 December 1975) is a road cyclist from France who represented her nation at the 1998, 1999 and 2004 UCI Road World Championships.

References

External links
 profile at Procyclingstats.com

1975 births
French female cyclists
Living people
Place of birth missing (living people)
Sportspeople from Sens
Sportspeople from Yonne
Cyclists from Bourgogne-Franche-Comté